Marius Copil (born 17 October 1990) is a Romanian professional tennis player playing on the ATP World Tour and ATP Challenger Tour. He is a member of the Romanian Davis Cup team. Copil is known for his extremely fast, powerful, and consistent serve.

Career

2009: ATP debut
In September 2009 he received wild card access to the main draw of 2009 BCR Open Romania, where he defeated his fellow countryman Victor Crivoi in the first round, but lost to Spaniard Rubén Ramírez Hidalgo in the second round.

2010–2012: Challenger Tour success 
In May 2010, Copil reached his first ATP Challenger Tour final at the Trofeo Paolo Corazzi as a qualifier. On his route to the final he won in three sets against Australian Bernard Tomic in the semifinals and finished runner-up to German Denis Gremelmayr.

Season 2011 started well for Copil. He reached his second Challenger final at the Tretorn Serie+ event in Kazan, Russia. In the final, he won against 4th seeded German Andreas Beck, in straight sets.

In season 2012, Copil beat world No. 13 Marin Čilić in the first round at the China Open in Beijing.

2015–2017: Major debut, Maiden ATP doubles title, Top 100 in singles
He made his Grand Slam main draw debut at the 2015 Australian Open, where he defeated Pablo Andújar. At the same tournament, he recorded the fastest serve at a Grand Slam: 242.0 km/h (150.4 mph).

In April at the Romanian Open partnering fellow Romanian Adrian Ungur, after saving five match points, they defeated Nicholas Monroe/Artem Sitak 17–15 in the match tiebreak to become the first Romanian team to win the Bucharest title since 1998 (Pavel/Trifu).

At the 's-Hertogenbosch Open, Copil defeated Jarkko Nieminen and Guillermo García López as a wildcard to reach the quarterfinals.

He made his top 100 singles debut after the 2017 Mutua Madrid Open, where he was a wildcard entry, at World No. 90 on 15 May 2017.

2018: Two ATP singles finals
Copil reached his first ATP World Tour-level singles final at the Sofia Open, where he lost to Mirza Bašić.

Ranked No. 93, Copil reached the final of the Swiss Indoors in Basel as a qualifier, losing to Roger Federer after defeating world No. 6 Marin Čilić and No. 5 Alexander Zverev on the way, his first ever wins over top-10 players. He became the lowest-ranked Basel finalist since No. 100 Patrick McEnroe in 1994 and 1st qualifier in the final since Baghdatis in 2005.

2019: Career-high singles ranking, Grand Slam success
Copil reached the 2019 Australian Open second round for the second time defeating Marcel Granollers in straight sets. As a result, he reached a career-high singles ranking of No. 56 on 28 January 2019.

His best showing in doubles at a Grand Slam in his career was reaching the third round of the 2019 French Open partnering Rohan Bopanna. He also reached the second round of the 2019 US Open (tennis) for the first time in his career in singles and doubles.

2020–2022: Loss of form, drop in rankings, out of top 350

ATP career finals

Singles: 2 (2 runners-up)

Doubles: 1 (1 title)

ATP Challenger and ITF Futures/World Tennis Tour finals

Singles: 20 (7–13)

Doubles: 19 (9–10)

Singles performance timeline

Wins over top 10 players

Davis Cup

Singles performances (18–8)

Doubles performances (2–1)

References

External links

 
 
 

1990 births
Sportspeople from Arad, Romania
Romanian male tennis players
Living people
21st-century Romanian people